John W. Cell (died 2001) was an American historian. He was a professor of history at Duke University, and the author of several books, including one comparing segregation in South Africa and the United States. He was awarded a Guggenheim Fellowship in 1986.

Selected works

References

2001 deaths
Duke University alumni
Duke University faculty
20th-century American historians
20th-century American male writers
American male non-fiction writers